The Reed Smoot House, also known as Mrs. Harlow E. Smoot House, was the home of Reed Smoot from 1892 to his death in 1941, and is located at 183 E. 100 South, Provo, Utah, United States. Smoot was a prominent US Senator best known for advocacy of protectionism and the Smoot–Hawley Tariff Act.

It was declared a National Historic Landmark in 1976.

Smoot himself drew the first designs for the house, and Richard K.A. Kletting completed the design. The house cost over four thousand dollars to complete. "Victorian Eclectic in design, it is a Stately, solid, early Mormon square block home with some Victorian exuberance displayed in the detailing. The home is linked with Utah's early political and religious history, and is the site of several visits from U.S. presidents in the early twentieth century (Historic Provo p. 20)." This house was nominated to be named to the Provo City Landmark Register on April 28, 1995.

The house today
After Smoot and his family moved to Washington D.C., the house was vacant for some time. Eventually, Smoot's son, Harlow, moved into the home. After being defeated for re-election in 1932, Smoot didn't return to live in the home on a permanent basis, choosing instead to spend his time in Salt Lake City and in Florida, where he died in 1941. Harlow Smoot and his wife continued to live in the home until their deaths and descendants have retained the home and kept it in excellent condition since that time. The house still contains many of the original furnishing, including the family china, a collection of pitchers, and a collection of paintings by Lee Greene Richards.

See also

 List of National Historic Landmarks in Utah
 National Register of Historic Places listings in Utah County, Utah

References

 Hicks, Republican Ascendancy, 221–22.
 National Park Service. "National Register of Historic Places Inventory -- Nomination Form." April 1995.
 Milton R. Merrill, "Reed Smoot, Apostle-Senator," Utah Historical Quarterly, XXVIII (October, 1960), 343–44.
 Provo City Landmarks Commission. Historic Provo. 2002
 Thomas F. O'Dea, The Mormons (Chicago, 1957), 173.

External links

 NRHP Listings in Provo Utah

Houses completed in 1892
Houses in Provo, Utah
Houses on the National Register of Historic Places in Utah
National Historic Landmarks in Utah
National Register of Historic Places in Provo, Utah
Individually listed contributing properties to historic districts on the National Register in Utah